Vumatel is a South African Licensed Infrastructure service provider, installing FTTH infrastructure throughout South Africa. Vumatel is owned by Community Investment Ventures Holdings Pty Ltd.

References

External links 
 
 

 

 
Telecommunications companies of South Africa
Infrastructure service providers of South Africa